Ventura County Derby Darlins (VCDD) is a women's flat track roller derby league based in Camarillo, California. Founded in 2007, it consists of two teams that compete against teams from other leagues. It is a member of the Women's Flat Track Derby Association (WFTDA).

History
The Derby Darlins is a non-profit organization and was founded in early 2007. In October, they hosted a seven-team tournament, which led to its annual Battle for the Coast tournament.

The league was accepted as a member of the Women's Flat Track Derby Association Apprentice Program in July 2012, and became a full member of the WFTDA in June 2013.

WFTDA rankings

References

Camarillo, California
Roller derby leagues established in 2007
Roller derby leagues in California
Sports in Ventura County, California
Women's Flat Track Derby Association Division 3
2007 establishments in California